GK Permskie Medvedi is a Russian handball team located in Perm. Their home matches are played at the V.P. Sukharev Sport Complex. They compete in the Russian Handball Super League and in the SEHA League.

In reaction to the 2022 Russian invasion of Ukraine, the International Handball Federation banned Russian athletes, and the European Handball Federation suspended the  Russian clubs from competing in European handball competitions.

Current squad
Squad for the 2022–23 season

Goalkeepers 
 86  Andrey Dyachenko
 88  Alexander Popov
Left Wingers
 7  Siarhei Kuzmin
 23  Maxim Salikov
Right Wingers
 31  Yan Kovalev
 47  Kirill Voronin
Line players
 13  Ilya Ryabov
 21  Ivan Firsov
 25  Viktar Zaitsau

Left Backs
 3  Nikita Dolganov
 5  Yuri Semenov
 30  Dzmitry Bogdanov
Central Backs
 10  Pavel Gnoevoy
 72  Dmitry Kalugin
Right Backs
 9  Egor Volynets
 99  Dzmitry Svistunov

References

External links

Sports clubs in Perm, Russia
Russian handball clubs